Charles Lutz was born outside of Pittsburgh, Pennsylvania in 1982. He studied Painting and Art History at the Pratt Institute in Brooklyn, NY, as well as Anatomy at Columbia University New York, NY. He received a BFA from the Pratt Institute College of Art in 2004. Lutz lives and works between Red Lion, PA, and Brooklyn, NY. 

Lutz most recently exhibited a series of new sculptures at Frank Lloyd Wright's Fallingwater in Mill Run, PA in 2022. Lutz took inspiration from the home as well as objects once sold at the Kaufmann's Department Store which helped fund the construction of the iconic home.  

Since his first solo exhibition in 2007, Lutz's work has been shown in major galleries and institutions throughout the US and abroad including the Andy Warhol Museum Pittsburgh, Carnegie Museum Pittsburgh, Artipelag Museum Stockholm, New Museum New York, Dickinson Gallery New York among others. His work dealing with consumerism and originality has been the subject of major exhibitions and critical acclaim. Lutz's work has even been cited In the recent Supreme Court case Warhol Foundation v. Goldsmith. 

Lutz is widely known for his work relating to the Art World, specifically his engagement with concepts of originality through his series of Denied Warhol works, which were submitted to the Warhol Authentication Board to be formally DENIED, in an act of creative destruction. Lutz's work engages with a long narrative of the ready-made in Contemporary and Modern Art, looking to further the concept through exploring our cultural relationship with originality, consumerism, and consumption. 

Lutz's show "Charts, Price Lists, Corrections, and Other Relevant Statements" at the Brooklyn project space Five Myles dealt with ideas of consumption and ego through large-scale paintings based on the auction sales price lists from Christie's and Sotheby's, as well as large-scale photo based works referencing the auction house's own promotional materials dealing with consumption.

The exploration into values and transference continued in his 2013 show "Ends and Means", this time focusing on our collective abstraction of value, looking at the trace of movement of currency and those facilitating such transactions. One of the most iconic paintings from the exhibition being a 12 ft tall monochrome red oil painting of former Federal Reserve Chairman Alan Greenspan, other works consisted of paintings constructed from used currency bank bags and large paintings based on re-transcriptions of robbery notes. The show was reviewed in both Modern Painters and The Wall Street Journal.

Later in 2013, Lutz went on to do one of his largest public installations to date. At the 100th Anniversary of Marcel Duchamp's groundbreaking and controversial Armory Show, Lutz was asked by the curator of Armory Focus: USA and former Director of The Andy Warhol Museum, Eric Shiner to create a site-specific installation representing the US. The installation "Babel" (based on Pieter Bruegel's famous painting) consisted of 1500 cardboard replicas of Warhol's Brillo Box (Stockholm Type) stacked 20 ft tall. All 1500 boxes were then given to the public freely, debasing the Brillo Box as an art commodity by removing its value, in addition to debasing its willing consumers.

Exhibitions 

SOLO EXHIBITIONS AND INSTALLATIONS

MODERN MADE LEISURE
An installation at Frank Lloyd Wright's Fallingwater
Mill Run, PA 
June 7 - December 31 2022 

NEW YORKER PAINTINGS
Galerie Clemens Gunzer 
KITZBÜHEL AUSTRIA August 5 – September 5, 2017

THE CORRUPTIBLE
Window Installation, New Museum. New York, NY July 29- August 25, 2014.

BABEL
Armory Focus: USA Curated by Eric Shiner. Site-specific installation, The Armory Show, New York, NY, March 6–10, 2013.

ENDS AND MEANS
C24 Gallery. New York, NY. January 17 - March 1, 2013.

CHARTS, PRICE LISTS, CORRECTIONS, AND OTHER RELEVANT STATEMENTS
FiveMyles Gallery. Brooklyn, NY. July 10 -August 28, 2010.

DENIAL & ACCEPTANCE
PEP Gallery, Brooklyn, NY. May 5 - June 15, 2007

SELECT GROUP EXHIBITIONS AND SPECIAL PROJECTS

SEA CHANGE, MIRANDA KUO GALLERY, NEW YORK, NY, OCT 1 – OCT 12 2017
 
SHED, Christies Fine Art Services, Christies Summer Preview, Red Hook, NY July 11, 2017

THE LEGACY OF ANDY WARHOL
ARTIPELAG MUSEUM STOCKHOLM, SWEDEN APRIL 14 – SEPTEMBER 24, 2016

SCENT CURATED BY JULIO FELIX IN CONJUNCTION WITH Y&S
Dickinson Gallery New York, NY December 15, 2015 - January 12, 2016

BIT-ROT, DOUGLAS COUPLAND
Witte de With Center for Contemporary Art, Rotterdam, Netherlands, September 11, 2015 - January 3, 2016.

THE FRIVOLOUS NOW Curated by Julio Felix in conjunction with Y&S
Alon Zakaim Gallery, London, UK June 24 - July 26, 2015.

WARHOL : FABRICATED
UAB Abroms-Engel Institute Birmingham, AL January 9 - February 28, 2015.

LOGICAL GUESSES Curated by House of the Nobleman
Driscoll Babcock Gallery New York, NY March 13 - April 26, 2014.

(CON)TEXT Curated by Tim Donovan Sharon Arts Center, 
Sharon, NH September 6 – October 25, 2013

REGARDING WARHOL, 60 ARTISTS FIFTY YEARS, Installation of BABEL The Andy Warhol Museum, Pittsburgh, PA February 3 - April 28, 2013.

ARTIFICIAL TREE (Brillo Stockholm Type) 15 ft. tall site specific sculptural installation
Produced in association with The Andy Warhol Museum and Carnegie Museum of Art, Pittsburgh, PA 
November 28, 2012 - January 2013.

RE-MAKE / RE-MODEL
Hionas Gallery. New York, NY. February 9 – March 3, 2012

TERMINAL 5, select sculptures included in the News Stand installation curated by Tobias Wong including works by Richard Prince, Gilbert and George and others.
Installed in the Eero Saarinen designed TWA Terminal, JFK International. New York, NY.
October 2004.

References

External links
Website of Charles Lutz
The New York Times, The Armory Show
The Huffington Post, Armory Art Trends
Art in America
Brooklyn Rail, Charles Lutz's Babel
Pittsburgh City Paper

20th-century American painters
American male painters
American contemporary painters
20th-century American sculptors
20th-century American male artists
American male sculptors
1982 births
Living people